Cirrhimuraena calamus, known commonly as the fringed-lipped snake-eel or the fringelip snake eel, is an eel in the family Ophichthidae (worm/snake eels). It was described by Albert Günther in 1870. It is a marine, temperate water-dwelling eel which is endemic to western Australia, in the eastern Indian Ocean. It forms burrows in the soft bottoms of inshore waters.

References

Ophichthidae
Fish described in 1870
Taxa named by Albert Günther